Grand-Bassam Department is a department of Sud-Comoé Region in Comoé District, Ivory Coast. In 2021, its population was 267,103 and its seat is the settlement of Grand-Bassam. The sub-prefectures of the department are Bongo, Bonoua, and Grand-Bassam.

History
Grand-Bassam Department was created in 1998 as a second-level subdivision via a split-off from Aboisso Department. At its creation, it was part of Sud-Comoé Region.

In 2011, districts were introduced as new first-level subdivisions of Ivory Coast. At the same time, regions were reorganised and became second-level subdivisions and all departments were converted into third-level subdivisions. At this time, Grand-Bassam Department remained part of the retained Sud-Comoé Region in the new Comoé District.

Notes

Departments of Sud-Comoé
1998 establishments in Ivory Coast
States and territories established in 1998